Raisen District is a district of Madhya Pradesh state of India. The town of Raisen is the district headquarters. The district is part of Bhopal Division. Sanchi University of Buddhist-Indic Studies is the first international university located at Sanchi Town.

Etymology
Raisen District takes its name from Raisen town, which is named after a fort. This fort is built on a sandstone hill, at the foot of which settles the town. The name is probably a corruption of Rajavasini or Rajasayan, the royal residence.

Geography
Raisen district is situated between the latitude 22 47' and 23 33' north and the longitude 7721' and 78 49' east. Sehore district lies in west, Vidisha district in the north, Sagar district in the east and south-east, Narsimhapur district in the south-east, Narmadapuram  and Sehore districts in the south.

Raisen district has Ten tehsils – Raisen, Goharganj, Begamganj, Gairatganj, Silwani, Bareli, Udaipura, Deori, Sultanpur and Badi.

History

The territory of the present-day Raisen district was once part of the Nizamat-A-Mashrif district of the Bhopal princely state. After the Bhopal State of independent India came into being, Raisen was declared a separate district on 5 May 1950.

The Buddhist monuments at Sanchi, a UNESCO world heritage site, are located in Raisen district. Bhimbetka rock shelters, another UNESCO world heritage site, are also located in Raisen district.

Demographics

According to the 2011 census Raisen District has a population of 1,331,597, roughly equal to the nation of Mauritius or the US state of Maine. This gives it a ranking of 365th in India (out of a total of 640). Its population growth rate over the decade 2001-2011 was 18.36%. Raisen has a sex ratio of 899 females for every 1000 males, and a literacy rate of 74.26%. 22.79% of the population lives in urban areas. Scheduled Castes and Scheduled Tribes make up 16.96% and 15.40% of the population respectively.

At the time of the 2011 Census of India, 97.28% of the population in the district spoke Hindi and 1.99% Urdu as their first language.

Tourism
Raisen District has many tourism places like:
 Sanchi:- World heritage, 46 km from Bhopal and 32 km from Vidisha
 Bhojpur:- The Bhojpur temple houses one of the largest Shiva lingam in India, which is 5.5 m (18 ft) tall and 2.3 m (7.5 ft) in circumference and is crafted out a single rock.

Transportation
Raisen is 43.8 km from Bhopal, Its connected to Bhopal via NH-86. NH-12 also passes through the district.

References

External links

 
Districts of Madhya Pradesh
1950 establishments in India